Devarda's alloy (CAS # 8049-11-4), is an alloy of aluminium (44% – 46%), copper (49% – 51%) and zinc (4% – 6%).

Devarda's alloy is used as reducing agent in analytical chemistry for the determination of nitrates after their reduction to ammonia under alkaline conditions. It is named for Italian chemist Arturo Devarda (1859–1944), who synthesised it at the end of the 19th century to develop a new method to analyze nitrate in Chile saltpeter.

It was often used in the quantitative or qualitative analysis of nitrates in agriculture and soil science before the development of ion chromatography, the predominant analysis method largely adopted worldwide today.

General mechanism
When a solution of nitrate ions is mixed with aqueous sodium hydroxide, adding Devarda's alloy and heating the mixture gently, liberates ammonia gas. After conversion under the form of ammonia, the total nitrogen is then determined by Kjeldahl method.

The reduction of nitrate by the Devarda's alloy is given by the following equation:

3  + 8 Al + 5  + 18  → 3  + 8

Distinction between NO3− and NO2− with spot tests
To distinguish between nitrate and nitrite, dilute HCl must be added to the nitrate. The brown ring test can also be used.

Similarity with the Marsh test

Devarda's alloy is a reducing agent that was commonly used in wet analytical chemistry to produce so-called nascent hydrogen under alkaline conditions in situ. In the Marsh test, used for arsenic determination, hydrogen is generated by contacting zinc powder with hydrochloric acid. So, hydrogen can be conveniently produced at low or high pH, according to the volatility of the species to be detected. Acid conditions in the Marsh test promote the fast escape of the arsine gas (AsH3), while in hyperalkaline solution, the degassing of the reduced ammonia (NH3) is greatly facilitated.

Long-debated question of the nascent hydrogen

Since the mid-19th century the existence of true nascent hydrogen has repeatedly been challenged. It was assumed by the supporters of this theory that, before two hydrogen atoms can recombine into a more stable H2 molecule, the labile H· free radicals are more reactive than molecular H2, a relatively weak reductant in the absence of a metal catalyst. Nascent hydrogen was supposed to be responsible for the reduction of arsenate or nitrate in arsine or ammonia respectively. Nowadays, isotopic evidence has closed the nascent hydrogen debate, presently considered to be a Gedanken artifact of romanticism.

See also
 Kjeldahl method
 Nitrate test
 Nitrite test
 Nascent hydrogen
 Marsh test
 Detection of:
 Arsine
 Stibine
 Raney nickel, prepared from an Al, Ni alloy also dissolved in concentrated NaOH
 Zinc-copper couple

References

External links
 Devarda's alloy - Substance Summary  (SID 24856330) (PubChem Substance)
 Safety data for Devarda's alloy
 Sigma Aldrich: Devarda’s alloy purum, for preparative purposes, grit
 GFS Chemicals: Devarda's alloy, reagent (ACS)
 National Pollutant Inventory - Copper and compounds fact sheet

Further reading
 
 

Aluminium alloys
Copper alloys
Name reactions
Hydrogen
Reducing agents
Aluminium–copper alloys